Agelas tubulata is a species of demosponge. It is tube-shaped or vase-shaped and variable in colour. It was first described by Lehnert & Rob van Soest in 1996, the type location being the Greater Antilles.

Description
Agelas tubulata is quite variable in shape and colouring. It usually takes the form of a group of vases or tubes, sometimes fused together, growing directly from a narrow base; it may be tan, orange or pinkish on the outside and orangeish-yellow to orange on the inside. The surface is usually smooth. The spicules are acanthostyles. It resembles Agelas conifera, but that species has a narrower base and some of the tubes branch from the sides of other tubes, sometimes forming antler- or club-shapes. Large solitary specimens of A. tubulata may be barrel-shaped and have deep recesses in the walls; they may resemble Agelas cerebrum, but that species has more regularly arranged recesses with orifices in between. The consistency of this sponge is elastic and compressible and zoanthids are sometimes found growing on the walls.

Distribution and habitat
This species is known from the Caribbean Sea, the Gulf of Mexico, the east coast of Florida, the Bahamas, Cuba, Jamaica, Panama, Belize and northeastern Brazil.
It was first described in 1996 by the German zoologist Helmut Lehnert and the Dutch zoologist Rob van Soest.

Biology
Like other demosponges, this sponge feeds by drawing in water through fine pores on its surface, filtering out the tiny organic particles and bacteria and expelling the excess water through the osculi.

This sponge is a hermaphrodite. The larvae are planktonic and known as parenchymella larvae. These are free-living, and when fully developed settle on the seabed and undergo metamorphosis into the adult form.

References

Agelasida
Animals described in 1996
Taxa named by Rob van Soest